Jean Frain de la Gaulayrie (13 July 1918 – 19 July 1980) was a French sailor. He competed at the 1948 Summer Olympics and the 1952 Summer Olympics.

References

External links
 

1918 births
1980 deaths
French male sailors (sport)
Olympic sailors of France
Sailors at the 1948 Summer Olympics – Dragon
Sailors at the 1952 Summer Olympics – Dragon
Sportspeople from Finistère